

N
 
 
 
 
 
 
 

Na

  (/)
  (/)
  (/)
  (/)
  (/)
 
  (/)
 
 
 
 
 
  (/)
 
  (/)
  (//)
  (/)
 
 
 
 
 
 
  (/)
 
  (/)
 
 
  (/)
  (/, /)
 
 
  (/)
 
 
 
 
  (/)
  (///)
  (/)
  (/)
 
 
 
  (/)
 
 
 
 
 
 
 
  (///)
 
 
  (//)
 
 
  (/)
  (/)
 
 
 
  (/)
 
  (/)
  (/)
 
  (//)
 
  (/)
  (/)

Ne

 
 
  (/)
 
 
 
  (//)
  (//)
 
 
 
 
 
 
 
 
 
 DSV Nemo
 
 
  (//)
  (/)
 
  (/)
  (//)
 
 
  (/)
 
 
 
 
 
 
 
 
 
  (/)
  (/)
 
 
 
 
 
  (/)
 
  (/, /)
 
  (/)
 
 
 
 
 
 
 
 
  (/)
 
 
  (/, /)
 
 
 
 
 
 
 
 
  (//)
  (/)
  (/)
  (/, /)
 
 
 

Ni

  (/, //)
  (/)
  (//)
 
 
  (/)
 
  (//)
 
  (/, /)
 
 
 
  (/)
 
 
 
 
 
  (/)
 
 
 
 
 
 

No

  (/)
 
 
 
 
  (/)
  (/, //)
 
 
 
  (/)
 
 
  (/)
 
 
 
 
 
 
 
 
  (/)
 
 
 
 
 
  (/, //)
 
 
 
 
  (/)
 
 
  (/)
 
 
 

Nr–Ny 
  (NR-1)
  (/)
  (/)
  (/)
 
  (/)
  (/)
 
 
  (/)
 

O 

  (/)
 
  (/)
 
  (/)
 
 
 
 
 
 
 
 
 
 
 
 
 
 
 
 
 
 
 
 
 
 

Oa–Og 

  (/)
  (/)
 
  (/)
 
  (///)
 
 
  (/)
  (/)
 
 
  (OSS-26/)
 
 
 
 
  (/)
 
 
 
  (//)
 
 
 
 
 
 
  (/)
  (/)
 
  (/)
 

Oh–On 

  (/)
  (1914)
 
 
 
 
  (/)
 
  (//)
 
  (//)
 
 
 
 
  (1797)
 
 
 
 
  (/)
 
 
 
  (/)
 
  (///)
 
 
 
 
 
  (SP-765)
  (//)
 
  (/)
  (//)
 
 
  (/)
 
 
 
  (/)
  (/)
 
 
 
 

Oo–Os 

 
 
 
 
  (/)
 
 
  (/)
  (/)
 
  (//)
 
 
 
  (/)
 
 
 
  (/, //)
 
  (/)
  (/)
  (/)
  (//)
 
  (/)
  (//)
  (/, /)
 
  (///)
  (/)
 
 
 
  (//)
 
 
 
  (//)
 
  (/)
 
  (/)
 
 
 
 
  (/)
 
 
  (/)

Ot–Oz 

 
  (/)
 
 
 
  (/)
 
  (/)
 
 
  (/)
 
  (/)
  (/)
  (/)
 
  (/)
 
 
 
 
 
  (//, /)
  (/)
  (/)
  (/)
 
  (///)
 
 
 

External links 
 List of homeports and their ships @ navy.mil
 Dictionary of American Naval Fighting Ships
  Naval Vessel Register